Sir Mark Wilson (22 October 1896 – 10 April 1956) was an Irish-born British colonial administrator and judge. He was Chief Justice of the Gold Coast from 1948 until his death in 1956.

Wilson was born in Castlecomer, Kilkenny. He was educated at Kilkenny College, Mountjoy School, and Trinity College, Dublin (BA, LLB). His university education was interrupted by service with the Royal Air Force from 1918 to 1919. He was Auditor of the College Historical Society and captained Wanderers F.C.

He was called to the Irish Bar in 1924, before joining the Colonial Administrative Service in Tanganyika as a Cadet the same year. In 1926 he was transferred to Uganda as a District Magistrate, being promoted to Senior Magistrate in 1935. In 1936 he returned to Tanganyika as a puisne judge. In 1948 he was appointed as Chief Justice of the Gold Coast. He died in office. He was knighted in the 1950 King's Birthday Honours List.

While Chief Justice of the Gold Coast, he presided over the Supreme Court sitting in January 1956 on allegations of misconduct against Emmanuel Obetsebi-Lamptey leading to the suspension of Obetsebi-Lamptey for two years.

Wilson died in Accra in 1956; he was succeeded as Chief Justice by Kobina Arku Korsah, the first African to hold the post.

Family 
Wilson married Dr Isabella Kilpatrick McNeilly in 1927; they had one son and two daughters.

References 

People educated at Kilkenny College
1956 deaths
Irish colonial officials
Alumni of Trinity College Dublin
Auditors of the College Historical Society
Colonial Administrative Service officers
Royal Air Force personnel
Knights Bachelor
Irish barristers
Gold Coast (British colony) judges
Tanganyika (territory) judges
Uganda Protectorate judges
Irish rugby union players
1896 births